Anna Morris (born 13 June 1995) is a Welsh track cyclist. 

Morris was a latecomer to cycling, only taking up the sport while studying medicine at the University of Southampton. She had a breakout year in 2022, earning three medals at the British National Track Championships before going on to represent Wales at the 2022 Commonwealth Games in Birmingham. Morris earned her first global medal when part of the team pursuit squad that took silver at the UCI Track World Championships in October 2022.

Major results

2022
National Track Championships
2nd Scratch
2rd Individual pursuit
3rd Points
UCI Track World Championships
2nd  Team pursuit

References

1995 births
Living people
Welsh female cyclists
Welsh track cyclists
Cyclists at the 2022 Commonwealth Games